Georges Bever (1884–1973) was a French film and television actor.

Selected filmography
 The Crystal Submarine  (1927)
 The Man in Evening Clothes (1931)
 When Do You Commit Suicide? (1931)
 Fun in the Barracks (1932)
 Monsieur Albert (1932)
 His Best Client (1932)
 Aces of the Turf (1932)
 The Midnight Prince (1934)
 Paris-Deauville (1934)
 Merchant of Love (1935)
 The Bureaucrats (1936)
 Adventure in Paris (1936)
 A Hen on a Wall (1936)
 Ménilmontant (1936)
 Mercadet (1936)
 Excursion Train (1936)
 Rasputin (1938)
 The Novel of Werther (1938)
 Golden Venus (1938)
 The West (1938)
 Whirlwind of Paris (1939)
 The Porter from Maxim's (1939)
 The Fatted Calf (1939)
 Behind the Façade (1939)
 Immediate Call (1939)
 Serenade (1940)
 Romance of Paris (1941)
 The White Truck (1943)
 The Captain (1946)
 The Wolf (1949)
 The Farm of Seven Sins (1949)
 The Atomic Monsieur Placido (1950)
 The Treasure of Cantenac (1950)
 La Poison (1951)
 Deburau (1951)
 Monsieur Octave (1951)
 A Mother's Secret (1952)
 The Lottery of Happiness (1953)
 Good Lord Without Confession (1953)
 It's the Paris Life (1954)
 Adam Is Eve (1954)
 Interpol Against X (1960)
 All the Gold in the World  (1961)
 Hello-Goodbye (1970)

References

Bibliography
 Goble, Alan. The Complete Index to Literary Sources in Film. Walter de Gruyter, 1999.

External links

1884 births
1973 deaths
French male film actors
Male actors from Paris